San Carlos   is a corregimiento in San Carlos District, Panamá Oeste Province, Panama with a population of 3,578 as of 2010. It is the seat of San Carlos District. Its population as of 1990 was 2,029; its population as of 2000 was 2,783.

References

Corregimientos of Panamá Oeste Province
Populated places in Panamá Oeste Province